Drena De Niro (born September 3, 1971) is an American actress and filmmaker who is the daughter of Diahnne Abbott and adoptive daughter of Robert De Niro after their marriage in 1976.

Life and career
De Niro is the daughter of actress Diahnne Abbott, and the adopted daughter of actor Robert De Niro, whose last name she took upon her mother's marriage to him in 1976.

De Niro enjoyed a bohemian upbringing that saw her divide her time between New York City, Los Angeles, and Italy. This transient lifestyle is said to have been a driving factor in her embrace of the arts.  Post schooling, she began her career in the entertainment industry working as a model. Further driven by her interest in fashion and music she became a DJ and Fashion Consultant. This led her to work as a musical supervisor for Giorgio Armani, serving as the creative force behind the coordination for runway shows.
 
Her transition to the field of acting began after landing a role in Allison Anders's Grace of My Heart. Since her premiere role, De Niro has worked with and trained under Larry Moss, author of the acting guide, Intent to Live, and Susan Batson of The Black Nexxus Acting Studio. With the turn of the millennium, De Niro set her sights on writing and directing her first film, Girls and Dolls. This documentary examined a young stylist's obsession with her dolls, and won De Niro the Best Directorial Debut Award at the New York Independent Film/Video Festival in 2001.  
 
More recently De Niro's endeavors have led her back to Italy, where she worked on her latest film. Since 2006, she has been the spokesperson for the Kageno Orphan Sponsorship Program, which helps provide care for orphaned children in Kageno villages. De Niro currently lives in New York City with her son, Leo.

Filmography

Film

Television

References

External links

1971 births
Living people
American film actresses
American television actresses
American voice actresses
Actresses from New York City
American adoptees
20th-century American actresses
21st-century American actresses
Drena